Sir Walter Vaughan Morgan, 1st Baronet (3 May 1831 – 12 November 1916), was a British businessman and the 578th Lord Mayor of London.

He was the sixth son of Thomas Morgan of Pipton, near Glasbury, Breconshire and his wife Elizabeth Vaughan. He served as Sheriff of London for 1900-01 and as Lord Mayor of London for 1905–05. In 1906 he was created a Baronet, of Whitehall Court in the City of Westminster. The six brothers had established in 1856 the Patent Plumbago Crucible Company, acquiring a factory site in Battersea; this company has become Morgan Advanced Materials.

His youngest brother Octavius Vaughan Morgan, FSA (1837–96) was a Liberal MP for Battersea from 1885 until 1892.

References

|-

1831 births
1916 deaths
Sheriffs of the City of London
20th-century lord mayors of London
20th-century English politicians
19th-century English politicians
Baronets in the Baronetage of the United Kingdom